This is a list of cancelled games for the 3DO Interactive Multiplayer.

List 
There are currently  games on this list.

See also 
 List of 3DO Interactive Multiplayer games
 Lists of video games

Notes

References 

3DO Interactive Multiplayer